Mussels with saffron is a traditional dish from Abruzzo, Italy. It is made with classic cooked mussels prepared with parsley, onion, bay leaf, white wine, olive oil and seasoned with Saffron of l'Aquila sauce.

See also
 Cuisine of Abruzzo
 List of fish dishes

References

Italian seafood dishes
Cuisine of Abruzzo